The Missionary Families of Christ (MFC), formerly known as Couples for Christ - Foundation for Family and Life (CFC-FFL) is a Philippine-based Catholic charismatic lay community that emphasizes individual renewal, family life renewal, Church renewal, societal renewal and evangelization. MFC is a missionary body, and the families and individuals that make up this association are to strive to be instruments of the Holy Spirit in renewing the face of the earth.

7 Core Values
The community's Core Values describe who they are and what they are called to do in the world. They provide parameters and constant guideposts in their moving on in their life and mission.
Centered on Christ.
Evangelistic and Missionary.
Focused on the family.
Being community.
Living a preferential option for the poor.
Exercising servant leadership.
Being a servant to the Church.

History

Missionary Families of Christ is the new name, mission and vision of the former CFC-FFL. CFC-FFL came about in 2007 through the initiative of leaders and members of Couples for Christ-Global Missions Foundation (CFC-GMFI), it is led by one of the first sixteen couples of Couples for Christ - Frank Padilla. It is recognized in various archdioceses and dioceses around the Philippines and has a number of international affiliations.

CFC-FFL originally started as a restoration movement within CFC; this was led by the Easter Group. The movement began on April 8, 2007, following the dissemination of then CFC Director Francisco Padilla's paper "CFC and GK – 3: At the Crossroads on our Journey of Hope and Joy," which argued that, among other things, CFC's identity and presence in Gawad Kalinga (GK) is being suppressed.

On June 22, 2007, the CFC Elders Assembly was held to elect the members of the CFC International Council and the Board of Elders. The Catholic Bishops Conference of the Philippines (CBCP) recommended that the elections be postponed in favor of further dialogue with the Easter Group. The Elders Assembly declined the recommendation, and proceeded with the election. The Easter group argued that by declining the recommendation of the CBCP, CFC has disobeyed the Roman Catholic Church. This event and continuing disagreements regarding Gawad Kalinga galvanized the Easter Group to separate, and form the Couples for Christ Foundation for Family and Life.

The group was established on August 1, 2007, when Bishop Gabriel Reyes, the bishop of Antipolo, officially recognized it as a private association of the faithful in his diocese. CFC FFL's break-away from GMFI was officially declared after their leaders met with Philippine bishops on August 28, 2007.

On October 6, 2019, CFC-FFL officially changed its name to Missionary Families of Christ, as the new name now describes and encompasses the mission and vision of the community.

Organization
According to MFC statutes, members of MFC are organized into cell groups called a Household. A group of Households form a larger grouping, and such larger groupings form an even larger grouping, forming a pyramidal structure.

Within MFC are various Sections that represent the different members of the family. Each Section is equally important as the other. Sections such as MFC Couples, MFC Kids, MFC Youth, MFC Singles (for unmarried adults below the age of 40), MFC Handmaids (for women above 40), and MFC Servants (for men above 40).

In 2012, as a response to the call to New Evangelization, MFC spearheaded the Live Christ, Share Christ Mission (LCSC) whose goal in to mainstream Catholic lay evangelization. The pillars of LCSC are the Live Pure Movement, Live Life, No One In Need Movement  and Live the Word.

Servant General
The International MFC Community is headed by the Servant General, Frank Padilla.

The Servant General (SG) acts as the keeper of the charism and exercises overall leadership and governance of the life and mission of the worldwide community.

Servant Leaders of MFC

In the Philippines, it is led by the Servant Council: made up of 7 members chosen by the SG for a term of 2 years, with the Country Servant as first among equals.

2013–2015: The Servant Leadership was composed of the Servant General, the Country Servant of the Philippines, the Body of Counselors to the CoS, and the Apostolic Board (advisory board to the SG).

2012: The Servant Leadership was composed of the Servant General, the Country Servant of the Philippines and the Body of Counselors to the CoS.

2008–2011: The Servant Leadership was composed of the Servant General and the Body of Counselors.

National Coordinators of Sections
There are 6 Sections in MFC: Couples, Singles, Youth, Kids, Handmaids and Servants. Each equally important to the life and mission of the community. Prior to MFC, the 5 Sections (Singles, Youth, Kids, Handmaids and Servants) were part of the Family Ministries. In the chart, the Coordinator under MFC Couples are the ones in charge of the Young Couples (YC).

International

America
MFC is present in Canada, USA, Ecuador, Argentina, Costa Rica, Nicaragua, Panama, Paraguay, Peru and the Cayman Islands.

MFC Canada is sanctioned by the Roman Catholic Archdiocese of Toronto. It is located in Scarborough, an eastern end of Toronto, Ontario, Canada. The ministries serve Catholics around British Columbia, Alberta, Manitoba, and Ontario with the majority residing in the Greater Toronto Area such as Brampton, Hamilton, Mississauga, Markham, and a few others.

Europe
MFC is present in Denmark, Finland, Iceland, Norway, Sweden, Austria, Germany, Switzerland, Ireland, Netherlands, UK, France, Monaco, Spain, Azerbaijan, Greece, Italy, Turkey, Czech Republic, Poland and Slovenia.

Africa
MFC is present in Botswana, Malawi, Nigeria, Ghana, DRCongo, Tanzania, Cameroon and Uganda.

Middle East
MFC is present in Kuwait, Qatar, Saudi Arabia and UAE

Asia
MFC is present in Cambodia, China, Malaysia, Myanmar, Singapore, Taiwan, Thailand, India and Vietnam.

Oceania
MFC is present in Australia, Fiji, New Zealand and Papua New Guinea

Footnotes

External links
Missionary Families of Christ
Live Christ, Share Christ Movement

Catholic lay organisations
Religious organizations based in the Philippines
Catholic Church in the Philippines
Christian organizations based in Canada